Ibrahim Awal (born 20 July 1990) is a Qatari footballer who is a striker for Al-Khor SC.

External links
 

1990 births
Living people
Qatari footballers
Association football forwards
Al-Rayyan SC players
Al-Khor SC players
Place of birth missing (living people)
Qatar Stars League players